Jisso Dam  is a gravity dam located in Kagoshima Prefecture in Japan. The dam is used for irrigation. The dam impounds about 9  ha of land when full and can store 480 thousand cubic meters of water. The construction of the dam was completed in 1946.

See also
List of dams in Japan

References

Dams in Kagoshima Prefecture